The Microascaceae are a family of fungi in the class Sordariomycetes, subclass Hypocreomycetidae. The family was published by David Malloch in 1970, an emended description based on Everet Stanley Luttrell's original 1951 publication. Family was updated in 2020.

Description
Microascaceae species have spherical to irregularly shaped, darkly colored fruit bodies. They are usually hairy and rarely smooth. The smooth spores are reddish brown to copper colored, one-celled, and have a germ pore at one or both ends. Asci can occur singly or in chains.

Genera
As accepted by Wijayawardene et al. 2020 (with number of species);
Acaulium  (4)

Brachyconidiellopsis  (1)
Canariomyces  (3)
Cephalotrichum  (37) - anamorph
Doratomyces  (3)
Echinobotryum  (2)
Enterocarpus  (2)
Fairmania  (1)
Gamsia  (5)

Kernia  (14)
Lomentospora  (1)
Lophotrichus  (8)
Microascus  (60)
Parascedosporium  (2)
Petriella  (8)

Pseudallescheria  (8)
Pseudoscopulariopsis  (2)

Rhinocladium  (11)
Scedosporium  (12)
Scopulariopsis  (87) - anamorph

Wardomyces  (11)
Wardomycopsis  (5)
Yunnania  (3)

References

External links

Ascomycota families
Microascales